is a major south-north street in central Kyoto, Japan. It is part of National Route 24 and National Route 367. The Karasuma Line subway runs under the street.

References 

Streets in Kyoto